Kotor-Varoš was a srez (a second-level administrative unit) centered at Kotor Varoš, that existed during the Kingdom of Yugoslavia and Socialist Yugoslavia. It had earlier been a kreis of Austro-Hungarian Bosnia and Herzegovina. It was a subdivision of the Vrbas Oblast in 1922–29, Vrbas Banovina in 1929–41, and thereafter the Socialist Republic of Bosnia and Herzegovina. It was abolished in 1955.

In 1948 and 1953, it included the six municipalities of Kotor Varoš, Previle, Skender Vakuf, Šiprage, Vrbanjci and Zabrđe.

Demographics
1953

References

Districts of Yugoslavia
Kotor Varoš